Forthcoming may refer to:

"Forthcoming", a song from the 1992 album Atmos, composed by Miroslav Vitous and performed by Jan Garbarek
"Forthcoming", a song from the 1997 album Care in the Community by Monk & Canatella
"Forthcoming", a song from the 1999 album Protechtion by Adam Beyer
Forthcoming, a 2000 book by Jalal Toufic

Not to be confused with:

Fourthcoming, a 2009 album by FourPlay String Quartet